The Kurilian Bobtail is a cat breed (or breed group, depending on registry) originating from the Russian Kuril Islands, as well as Sakhalin Island and the Kamchatka peninsula of Russia. Short- or long-haired, it has a semi-cobby body type and a distinct short, fluffy tail. The back is slightly arched with hind legs longer than the front, similar to those of the Manx.  The breed is also called the Kuril Islands Bobtail, Kuril Bobtail (both often misspelled "Kurile") and Curilsk Bobtail, and may be referred to without "Bobtail". It is sometimes also spelled Kurilean. The original short-haired variant is a natural breed, known on the islands for over 200 years. As selectively bred pets, they have been popular in USSR and to some extent other parts of Europe, especially for their rodent-hunting abilities, since the middle of the 20th century, but remained rare in North America .

Kurilians are recognized as a breed group of a pair related short- and [semi-]long-haired breeds by The International Cat Association (TICA), which considers them "Advanced New Breeds" ineligible for championship status) and by the Fédération Internationale Féline (FIFe). The World Cat Federation (WCF) recognizes them as a single breed.  , the Cat Fanciers' Association (CFA) did not recognize the breed at all.

While possibly closely related to the Japanese Bobtail breed – both share the same kind of kinked, short tail, but the Japanese is leaner, more angular and less cobby – the Kurilian originated on the opposite side of Eurasia from the similarly named Karelian Bobtail of western Russia and Finland, and is thus unlikely to be a near relative. Genetic studies may eventually demonstrate the breed's connection to others.

Origin 
This new breed is not well known outside of its native territories. Though it is a native to Japan with a long history on a chain of islands, known as the Kurils, that runs from the easternmost point of Russia to the tip of Japan's Hokkaido Island. Also known as the Kuril Bobtail or the Curilsk Bobtail, because the Kuril Islands are Russian-owned, this breed is being developed and promoted as a Russian aboriginal breed that is separate and distinct from the Japanese Bobtail. There are several versions of the origin of the breed. The main origin of the breed is considered to be from a mixture (crossbreeding) of Japanese Bobtail cats with Siberian cats brought by sailors to the Kuril Islands. It was adopted by the WCF in 1994.

Characteristics 
In the wild, this cat is an excellent fisher and hunter, which may explain why the Kurilian loves to play in water. The Kurilian's wild look is not reflected in the temperament of the breed. It is known for its clever and gentle nature.

The variety is mostly known for its distinctive "pom-pom" kinked, short tail. Short- or longhaired, it has a distinct short, fluffy tail ranging from 2 to 10 vertebrae. The back is slightly arched, with hind legs longer than the front,. It has a medium to large, substantial, muscular build and rounded-rectangular, wide face. Eye colors conform to the color of the coat. The colors yellow, green, and yellow-green are preferred. There are semi-longhair and shorthair Kurilians. All colors without colorpoint and solid are allowed. Part of the reason for its rarity is that there are just two or three kittens in a litter. The most common coat colors are in red, to grey, to bobtail stripes. The lifespan of a Kurilian Bobtail ranges from 15 to 20 years, owing to their breed's being developed in the wild.

References

External links

Cat breeds
Cat breeds originating in Japan
Cat breeds and types with suppressed tails
Natural cat breeds